Place: Pražský hrad, Prague

Date: 03.06.2009

Elite - Men

See also
Pražské schody - main page

References
 - official results

2009
2009 in cyclo-cross